Fostina Dixon (born August 16, 1956, Wilmington, Delaware) is an American jazz saxophonist, clarinetist, flautist, and vocalist.

Early life and studies
Dixon was born in Wilmington, Delaware and began her career in the early 1970s, playing with Buddy Collette, Frank Foster, and Andy McGhee. She studied at Boston University, Berklee College of Music, and California Institute of the Arts, where she received a Fine Arts degree. She also studied at Wilmington University, where she received a master's degree in education.

Career
In the early 1980s Dixon led her own group, "Collage", and worked with Cab Calloway, Jimmy Cleveland, Gil Evans, Slide Hampton, Major Holley, Melba Liston, and Gerald Wilson. She was a saxophonist in Marvin Gaye's touring band in the last few years of his life. Following this she played with Roy Ayers, Andrew Cyrille, and Charlie Persip, and worked with a new ensemble under her own direction, "Winds of Change".

From 1986 to 1988 she accompanied James "Blood" Ulmer on tour, then appeared on Calvin Weston's 1989 album Dance Romance. In the 1990s she worked with Abbey Lincoln and Loud Minority.

She founded the Wilmington Youth Jazz Band in 2004 in her native city.

Critical reactions
A review of Here We Go Again in All About Jazz described it as "a thoroughly engaging journey that seamlessly transports the listener with spiritual-like soundscapes."

AllMusic writes of Dixon that her "commitment is total, and she is also eager to extend her audience by finding a style in both playing and composing that appeals beyond the merely intellectual."

Discography
 Here We Go Again Fossiebear Inc. (2016) The album has seven tracks for a total duration of 18:30.

References

External links
 

Living people
20th-century American singers
20th-century American saxophonists
20th-century American women singers
20th-century flautists
American jazz clarinetists
American jazz flautists
American jazz saxophonists
American jazz singers
American women jazz singers
Berklee College of Music alumni
Boston University alumni
California Institute of the Arts alumni
Musicians from Wilmington, Delaware
Wilmington University alumni
Women flautists
Women jazz saxophonists
1956 births